Anna Clyne (born 9 March 1980, in London) is an English composer, now resident in New York, US.  She has worked in both acoustic music and electro-acoustic music.

Biography
Clyne began writing music as a child, completing her first composition at age 7. Her first composition to receive a public performance was at the Oxford Youth Prom when she was 11. She formally studied music at the University of Edinburgh, from which she graduated with a first-class Bachelor of Music degree with honours.  She later studied at the Manhattan School of Music and earned a MA degree in music.  Her teachers have included Marina Adamia, Marjan Mozetich and Julia Wolfe.

Clyne was director of the New York Youth Symphony's "Making Score" program for young composers from 2008 to 2010. In October 2009, Clyne and Mason Bates were named co-composers in residence with the Chicago Symphony Orchestra (CSO), as of the 2010–2011 season. She took up the residency in 2010, for a scheduled term of 3 years. In January 2012, her CSO contract as co-composer in residence was extended through the 2013-2015 season. Clyne was announced as the composer-in-residence for Orchestre national d'Île-de-France from 2014 to 2016, the Baltimore Symphony Orchestra's 2015–2016 season, and The Berkeley Symphony Orchestra from 2017–2019. Clyne was appointed Associate Composer with the Scottish Chamber Orchestra from 2019–2022.

In 2022–2023, Clyne is Composer-in-Residence with both the Philharmonia Orchestra and the Trondheim Symphony Orchestra. For the 2023-2024 season she will be Composer-in-Residence with the Helsinki Philharmonic Orchestra.

Various arts institutions have commissioned and presented Clyne’s work, including the Barbican, Carnegie Hall, Kennedy Center, Los Angeles Philharmonic, MoMA, Philharmonie de Paris, Royal Concertgebouw Orchestra, San Francisco Ballet, and the Sydney Opera House.

In 2013, the concert overture Masquerade was commissioned by BBC Radio 3 to open the Last Night of the Proms, where the BBC Symphony Orchestra was conducted by Marin Alsop. Clyne was nominated for the 2015 Grammy Award for Best Contemporary Classical Composition for her double violin concerto, Prince of Clouds. Works for soloist and orchestra form an important part of her output, as is also evident from The Seamstress (2015), a single-movement violin concerto that incorporates a whispered recitation of the poem A Coat by Yeats, and the five movement cello concerto Dance (2019), commissioned by Inbal Segev and recorded by her in 2020, which has received more than eight million plays on Spotify. 

Clyne has done several cross-genre collaborations,  and has also worked with Yo-Yo Ma, Pekka Kuusisto, Martin Fröst, and Jess Gillam. 

Clyne has explored her fascination with visual arts in several projects: five contemporary artworks inspired Abstractions (2016); Color Field (2020), takes inspiration from the artwork of Mark Rothko; and a film collaboration with Jyll Bradley, entitled Woman Holding a Balance (2021). 

Clyne has been described as a ‘composer of uncommon gifts and unusual methods’ in a New York Times 2015 profile and ‘fearless’ by NPR. In 2018, the music critic Corinna da Fonseca Wollheim selected Clyne's composition, Lavender Rain, for a New York Times feature on "5 Minutes that Will Make You Love Classical Music."

A CD of her orchestral music, Mythologies, was released in October 2020.

Compositions

Orchestra
 This Moment for orchestra (2022)
 PIVOT for orchestra (2021)
 Color Field for orchestra (2020)
 Restless Oceans for orchestra (2018)
 Abstractions for orchestra (2016)
 RIFT for orchestra (2016)
 This Midnight Hour for orchestra (2015)
 Masquerade for orchestra (2013)
 Night Ferry for orchestra (2012)
 <<rewind<< for orchestra (2005–2006)

Chamber orchestra

 Fractured Time for sinfonietta (2020)
 Shorthand for solo cello and string orchestra (2020)
 Stride for string orchestra (2020)
 Sound and Fury for chamber orchestra (2019)
 Rest These Hands for chamber orchestra (2014)
 Within Her Arms for string orchestra (2008–2009)

Chamber music

 A Slash of Blue for chamber ensemble (2022)
 Strange Loops for clarinet quintet (2021)
 Shorthand for cello and string quintet (2020)
 Overflow for wind ensemble (2020)
 A Thousand Mornings for piano trio (2020)
 Woman Holding a Balance for string quartet (2020)
 Breathing Statues for string quartet (2019)
 Masquerade for wind ensemble (2019)
 Just As They Are for amplified ensemble and pre-recorded audio (2015)
 This lunar Beauty for soprano, mixed ensemble and pre-recorded audio (2015)
 A Wonderful Day for amplified ensemble and pre-recorded audio (2013)
 A Hymn to the Virgin (Companion piece to "Lady Flow'r") for string quintet and tape (1930 rev. 1934 arr. 2010)
 Lady Flow'r (Companion piece to the arrangement of "Hymn to the Virgin") for string quintet and tape (2010)
 Primula Vulgaris for string quartet (2010)
 Shadow of the Words for string quartet (2010)
 The Violin - Complete works (7 short pieces for multi-tracked violins and optional video component by Josh Dorman) (2009)
 The Violin - Blue Hour for string ensemble (2009)
 The Violin - Lavender Rain for string ensemble (2009)
 The Violin - October Rose for 2 violins (2009)
 The Violin - Resting in the Green for 2 violins and tape or 5 violins (2009)
 The Violin - Ship of Stars for 2 violins and tape or 6 violins (2009)
 The Violin - Tea Leaves for 2 violins (with optional tape) (2009)
 1987 for ensemble (2008)
 Beware Of for alto flute, harp, viola and tape (2007)
 Next. Stop for ensemble and tape (2007)
 Roulette for string quartet (2007)
 Paint Box for amplified cello with guitar amp, music box and pre-recorded audio (2006)
 Steelworks for flute, bass clarinet, percussion and tape (2006)

Soloist and orchestra

 Time and Tides for violin and orchestra (2022)
 Weathered for clarinet and orchestra (2022)
 Quarter Days for string quartet and orchestra (2021)
 Glasslands for soprano saxophone and orchestra (2021)
 Shorthand for cello and string orchestra (2020)
 DANCE for cello and orchestra (2019)
 Three Sisters for mandolin and string orchestra (2017)
 The Seamstress for violin and orchestra (2014–2015)
 Secret Garden for drum set and tape (2013)
 Prince of Clouds for two violins and orchestra (2012)
 Rest These Hands for violin and string orchestra (2014)
 On Track for piano and tape (2007)
 Rapture for clarinet and tape (2005)
 Choke for baritone saxophone (or bass clarinet) and tape (2004)
 Fits + Starts for amplified cello and tape (2003)

Solo and duet

 Red Nines for solo piano (2021)
 Perched for solo flute and tape (2021)
 Zero at the Bone for solo bass clarinet and tape (2021)
 Reveal for solo viola and optional pre-recorded track (2020)
 Hopscotch for flute (2019)
 Snake & Ladder for soprano saxophone and live processing (2019)
 Snake & Ladder for clarinet and live processing (2019)
 Secret Garden for drum set and tape (2013)
 Rest These Hands for cello (2009)
 Rest These Hands for violin (2009)
 Rest These Hands for viola (2009)
 On Track for piano and tape (2007)
 Rapture for clarinet and tape (2005)
 Choke for baritone saxophone (or bass clarinet) and tape (2004)
 Fits + Starts for amplified cello and tape (2003)

Brass ensemble
 Spangled Unicorn (2011)

Ensemble with voice

 Between the rooms for soprano and string quintet (2022)
 This Lunar Beauty for soprano, mixed ensemble and pre-recorded audio (2015)
 Postponeless Creature for 3 female voices and ensemble (2014)
 The Lost Thought for 3 female voices and ensemble (2013)
 As Sudden Shut for 3 female voices and ensemble (2012)
 Blush for baritone, laptop and chamber ensemble (2007)

Choral works
 The Years for SATB chorus and orchestra (2021)
 In Thy Beauty for soprano, SATB chorus and orchestra
 The Heart of Night for choir (2020)
 Body Compass for children's chorus and string quintet (2017)
 Pocket Book LXV for 8 voices (2015)
 Pocket Book VIII for 8 voices (2015)

Discography 

 The Kreutzer Project (AVIE 2022)
 Mythologies (AVIE 2020)
 Mythologies on Vinyl (AVIE 2020)
 DANCE (AVIE 2020)
 Touch Harmonious (In A Circle 2020)
 E PLURIBUS UNUM (Navona 2020)
 The World is (Y)ours (Arcantus 2019)
 The Violin (National Sawdust Tracks 2017)
 BOAC Field Recordings (Cantaloupe 2015)
 Two x Four (Cedille 2014)
 Blue Moth (Tzadik 2012)
 Arcana VI by John Zorn (Tzadik 2012)
 ACO Playing it Unsafe (ACO 2011)
 The Exploding Piano (CD Baby 2010)
 I Am Not (New Amsterdam 2010)

References

External links
 The New York Times | Anna Clyne, a Composer Who Creates With Images
 Gramophone | Contemporary Composer: Anna Clyne | Richard Whitehouse has no doubt that things will only get better for this already popular and much-recorded composer 
 Los Angeles Times | L.A. Chamber Orchestra to premiere Anna Clyne’s ‘Prince of Clouds’
 Chicago Reader | Anna Clyne scores big | Symphonies still prefer dead composers, but Clyne beat the odds to land a plum job with the CSO at the tender age of 30
 Official Anna Clyne webpage
 Official Anna Clyne Facebook page

1980 births
Living people
Women classical composers
British classical composers
Alumni of the University of Edinburgh
Musicians from London
Manhattan School of Music alumni
21st-century English women musicians
21st-century women composers